Melaten is the central cemetery of Cologne, North Rhine-Westphalia, which was first mentioned in 1243. It was developed to a large park, holding the graves of notable residents.

Name 
The name "Melaten" refers to a hospital for the sick and lepers from the 12th century. The "hoff to Malaten" (modern German: Hof der Maladen, or "yard of the malades") is first mentioned in a 1243 document.

Location 
Melaten is in the north of the municipal district of Lindenthal. It is surrounded by streets, in the south Aachener Straße (Köln), in the east Piusstraße, in the west Oskar-Jäger-Straße and the Melatengürtel, and in the north Weinsbergstraße. The 435,000-square-metre cemetery had 55,540 graves in 2008, and is the largest cemetery in the city.

History 
Melaten is located approximately one kilometre west of the city district of Cologne, just beyond the Bischofsweg (Köln), the historical boundary between the territory of the city and that of the archbishop. The hospital therefore fell under the jurisdiction of the archbishop, and was in spiritual hands.

Burials 

Notable burials on Melaten include:

 Wilhelm Albermann (1835–1913), sculptor

 Wolfgang Anheisser (1929–1974), baritone
 Johannes Theodor Baargeld (1892–1927), artist
 Dirk Bach (1961–2012), actor, TV-presenter

 Wilhelm Backhaus (1884–1969), pianist

 Erika Berger (1939–2016), author

 Willy Birgel (1891–1973), actor

 Hans Böckler (1875–1951), politician and trade union leader

 Fritz Burgbacher (1900–1978), politician

 Claus Hinrich Casdorff (1925–2004), journalist

 Holger Czukay (1938–2017), avantgarde musician

 Wilhelm Ludwig Deichmann (1798–1876), banker

 Nevio De Zordo (1943–2014), Italien bobsledder

 :de:Joseph DuMont (1811–1861), newspaper publisher
 :de:Marcus DuMont (1784–1831), founder of :de:Kölnische Zeitung

 Margot Eskens, singer, corridor Y (26).

 Jean Marie Farina (1809–1880), producer of Eau de Cologne

 Johann Maria Farina (1685–1766), founder of Eau de Cologne

 Ludwig Gies (1887–1966), sculptor
 Robert Görlinger (1888–1954), mayor 1948 to 1949

 Andreas Gottschalk (1815–1849), physician

 Hermann Grüneberg (1827–1894), chemist

 Alice Guszalewicz (1866–1940), spera singer

 Josef Haubrich (1889–1961), jurist, patron of the arts

 Ferdinand Hiller (1811–1885), composer
 Andreas Hillgruber (1925–1989), historian

 István Kertész (1929–1973), conductor
 Irmgard Keun (1905–1982), novelist

 Karel Krautgartner (1922–1982), jazz musician
 Hildegard Krekel (1952–2013), actress

 Eugen Langen (1833–1895), engineer

 Jaki Liebezeit (1938–2017), drummer

 Wilhelm Marx (1863–1946), chancellor
 Georg Meistermann (1911–1990), artist

 Gustav von Mevissen (1815–1899), entrepreneur
 Lucy Millowitsch (1905–1990), actress
 Willy Millowitsch (1909–1999), actor

 Wilhelm Mülhens (1762–1841), merchant
 Wolfgang Müller von Königswinter (1816–1873), poet

 Ernst Wilhelm Nay (1902–1968), artist

 Alfred Nourney (1892–1972), Titanic survivor

 Alfred Freiherr von Oppenheim (1934–2005), banker

 Nicolaus August Otto (1832–1891), inventor of the motor named after him

 Gunther Philipp (1918–2003), Schauspieler (Lit. D)
 Sigmar Polke (1941–2010), Maler und Photograph (Lit. D Nr. 28)

 Anton Räderscheidt (1892–1970), painter

 August Reichensperger (1808–1895), jurist, politician and patron of the Cologne Cathedral
 Heinrich Reissdorf, brewery owner
 Fritz Rémond Jr. (1902–1976), actor and theatre manager

 Johann Heinrich Richartz (1796–1861), founder of Wallraf-Richartz-Museum
 Albert Richter (1912–1940), cyclist
 Wilhelm Riphahn (1889–1963), architect

 August Sander (1876–1964), photographer

 Elisabeth Scherer (1914–2013), actress

 Bernard Schultze (1915–2005), painter

 Helma Seitz (1913–1995), actress

 Vincenz Statz (1819–1898), architect and sculptor

 Rolf Stommelen (1943–1983), racing driver

 Jón Sveinsson (1857–1944), author
 Christine Teusch (1888–1968), politician
 Gisela Uhlen (1919–2007), actress

 Oswald Mathias Ungers (1926–2007), architect

 Ferdinand Franz Wallraf (1748–1824), see Wallraf-Richartz-Museum

 Guido Westerwelle (1961–2016), politician
 Johann Peter Weyer (1794–1864), Stadtbaumeister

 Erwin Wickert (1915–2008), diplomat andauthor
 Leopold von Wiese (1876–1969), sociologist

 Hans-Jürgen Wischnewski (1922–2005), politician
 Hermann Wissmann (1853–1905), governor of Deutsch-Ostafrika

 Otto Wolff (1881–1940), industrialist
 Otto Wolff von Amerongen (1918–2007), entrepreneur
 Ernst Friedrich Zwirner (1802–1861), architect, Dombaumeister
 Helmut Martin (1940–1999), sinologist

References

External links
 

Cemeteries in Cologne